Jefferson College, in Washington, Mississippi, was founded as an all-male college but operated primarily as a college preparatory school and later military boarding school during most of its history.  Named in honor of Thomas Jefferson, the college was chartered in 1802, but did not begin operation until 1811.

Due to declining enrollment and financial difficulties, the facility closed in 1964.  The historic campus was listed on the National Register of Historic Places in 1970, and was designated a Mississippi Landmark in 1985. The site is operated as an historic museum and park.

History

Development
Chartered on May 13, 1802, by the General Assembly of the Mississippi Territory, Jefferson College was the first institution of higher learning in Mississippi.  It opened in 1811 with 15 students, as a preparatory school, under the name Washington Academy—a one-room, wood-frame structure, built on the college property.  By 1817, the institution had become a fully developed college.  The first permanent buildings, constructed of brick, were completed in 1820.  By 1840, Jefferson College offered the degrees of Bachelor of Arts and Master of Arts.

Military emphasis
During the American Civil War, Jefferson College was closed. After the end of the war, the buildings were used by the Freedmen's Bureau to aid transition to a society of free labor.  In November 1865, the school's Board of Trustees regained control of the facility.  The institution reopened in 1866 as a preparatory school and continued as such until it closed in 1964.

Between 1872 and 1911, under the tenure of Superintendent J.S. Raymond, the college had its longest interval of stable governance, with increased enrollment.  By 1893, the institution had been reorganized as a military school, taking the name Jefferson Military College. Instruction was entirely secondary education. Early in the 20th century, dormitories were built to accommodate more recruits.  By the late 1930s, enrollment had increased to about 100 students.

Decline
Following World War II, declining student enrollment, low tuition, and lack of external funding caused financial hardship for Jefferson College.  After 150 years of operation and unable to pay its debts, the facility closed in May 1964. In 1965, all buildings and lands owned by Jefferson College were conveyed to the State of Mississippi in exchange for discharging the school's debts.

In 1971, Jefferson College was placed under administrative control of the Mississippi Department of Archives and History (MDAH).  Detailed plans were developed for preserving the historic buildings, and restoration work began in the mid-1970s. In 1977, Jefferson College was opened to the public as a State Historic Site.

Historic buildings

Three buildings, constructed during the 19th century, are contributing resources for the Jefferson College National Historic District:

The East Wing, completed in 1820, was the first permanent college building.  It is a 3-story, brick building constructed in Federal architectural style with a 5-bay facade.  School rooms and the library were located on the first floor of the East Wing. Student dormitory rooms were located on the second and third floors, as well as in the attic.
The President's House is a two-story, wood-frame home that was constructed around 1830 for John Branch and later acquired by Dr. John Inge. The house was located on property adjacent to Jefferson College and was purchased by the college from Dr. Inge in 1842, for use as the college superintendent's residence. In the mid-1970s, MDAH renovated the structure to serve as the residence for the Director of Historic Jefferson College.
The West Wing was completed in 1839, with the same exterior design as the East Wing.  The college mess hall was on the first floor of the West Wing, and the building was also used for faculty apartments and administrative offices.

Jefferson College campus includes five other historic buildings constructed during the 19th and 20th centuries:
The Steward's Building is a 2-story brick structure completed in 1839. It was used for storage and as lodging for the steward and kitchen staff, who were originally enslaved African-American workers.
The East Kitchen is a 2-story brick structure completed in 1839. It was the primary cooking area for Jefferson College and staffed by enslaved African-American workers.
Raymond Hall is a 2-story brick building constructed in 1915 to serve as a student dormitory. It was damaged by fires in 1940, 1943, and 1947, but was repaired after each incident. As part of the state historic site, Raymond Hall is used as a classroom and public program area.
Prospere Hall was constructed in 1931 as a dormitory for younger students. The building houses administrative offices and serves as the visitor's center and museum for Historic Jefferson College.
Carpenter Hall was constructed in 1937 as a student dormitory, but in later years it also contained faculty apartments. As part of Historic Jefferson College, Carpenter Hall is mainly used for storage.

Historic events at Jefferson College
In January 1807, acting Governor Cowles Mead of the Mississippi Territory suspected Aaron Burr of a conspiracy to separate regions of Mississippi and Louisiana from the United States and ordered the territorial militia to capture Burr to stand trial for treason. In February 1807, a grand jury convened on the grounds of Jefferson College and found Burr not guilty of any crime or misdemeanor against the United States.

Between 1802 and 1817, Washington, Mississippi, was the capital of the Mississippi Territory, and the General Assembly of the territory often met in a tavern, known as Assembly Hall, which was located adjacent to Jefferson College. Assembly Hall was destroyed by fire in 1993.

Between July 7 and August 17, 1817, the Mississippi Statehood Convention was held in a Methodist church on property adjacent to Jefferson College. Over time, the church building deteriorated and was no longer standing by the mid-1870s.

Notable alumni
Albert Gallatin Brown, Governor of Mississippi (1844 to 1848)
John Francis Hamtramck Claiborne, a member of the U. S. House of Representatives from Mississippi
Jefferson Davis, president, Confederate States of America
Pete Heine, Louisiana politician
Prentiss Ingraham, Confederate military officer and writer
Clyde V. Ratcliff, member of the Louisiana State Senate from 1944 to 1948

Jefferson College historic site
As a historic site, several buildings are open to the public. These include the West Wing, the kitchen buildings, and Prospere Hall.

In popular culture
Jefferson College was a location site for the films:
 The Horse Soldiers, 
 North and South (serving as the U.S. Military Academy of West Point),
 Huckleberry Finn (1974 film),
 The Adventures of Huck Finn.

See also
Elizabeth Female Academy

References

External links

 Historic Jefferson College - official site at Mississippi Department of Archives and History
 Jefferson Military College as film location site
 IMDb: North and South (1985 TV Mini-Series) 

 
Defunct United States military academies
Federal architecture in Mississippi
Educational institutions established in 1802
Defunct private universities and colleges in Mississippi
Education museums in the United States
Open-air museums in the United States
History museums in Mississippi
Museums in Adams County, Mississippi
Mississippi Landmarks
1802 establishments in Mississippi Territory
Historic districts on the National Register of Historic Places in Mississippi
National Register of Historic Places in Adams County, Mississippi
University and college buildings on the National Register of Historic Places in Mississippi
Educational institutions disestablished in 1964